Volcán de La Corona is a  high extinct volcano on the Canary Island of Lanzarote (Spain), near the village of Yé in the municipality of Haría. Its eruption around 4000 years ago covered a large area of the northeast of the island with lava, creating the Malpais de la Corona and two of the island's most-visited geological attractions, the Cueva de los Verdes and the Jameos del Agua.

References
Rogers, B. and S. (2005). Travellers: Lanzarote & Fuertaventura, Peterborough: Thomas Cook Publishing. 

Volcanoes of the Canary Islands